Abbasabad (also Romanized as ‘Abbāsābād; also known as Bālābasi and Bul ‘Abbās) is a village in Shirvan Rural District, in the Central District of Borujerd County, Lorestan Province, Iran. At the 2006 census, its population was 544, in 132 families.

References 

Towns and villages in Borujerd County